Samma is a community and a tribe that has origins in Sindh. The Samma are spread across Pakistan and North- West India, being most concentrated in Sindh, but are also found throughout the Punjab region as well as parts of Balochistan, Gujarat and Rajasthan. The Sandhai Muslims are Samma who converted to Islam. Offshoots of the main branch of Samma include the migrant Jadejas and Chudasamas of India.

History
The Samma's history, along with other tribes in the region, is intertwined with the Jats, either as a subdivision of it or a group at par with the Jats. They faced restrictions similar to that of Jats. Later, both Sammas and Sumras started claiming to be Rajput tribes whose chiefs had converted to Islam and were followers of Suhrawardi Sufi saints, with their base at Uch and Multan. Firishta mentions two groups of zamindars in Sindh, namely Sumra and Samma.

Ala al-Din Khilji (1296-1316) mounted a number of campaigns in the region, battling the Sumra princes whose cycle of capitulation and rebellion could be charted exactly to the perceived military stress on the metropole. Yet, the Delhi Sultans and their governor rarely resorted to invading Sumra held territories, relying instead on alliances with tribal elites and local power struggles. Against the Sumras, Khiljl advanced the cause of the tribe of Samma. The conflict guaranteed a rolling supply of princes and tribal chiefs wanting alliances with the center. The tussle for dominance between the Sumras and the Samma lasted until the reign of Firuz Shah Tughluq (1351- 1388), when the Jam emirs of Samma were finally able to end Sumra dominance, taking over lower Sindh.

See also 

 Samma dynasty

References

Further reading 
 

People from Sindh
People from Punjab, Pakistan

People from Balochistan, Pakistan
Pakistan
Sindh